The 2010 Atlantic Sun men's basketball tournament took place from March 3–6, 2010 at University Center in Macon, Georgia.

Format
The top eight eligible men's basketball teams in the Atlantic Sun Conference received a berth in the conference tournament.  After the 20 game conference season, teams are seeded by conference record.  The East Tennessee State Buccaneers receive an automatic bid to the NCAA tournament.  Since there was a four-way tie for the conference regular season title, the second seeded Jacksonville Dolphins, who advanced the furthest in the tournament, will receive an automatic bid to the NIT. Florida Gulf Coast and South Carolina-Upstate were not eligible to compete in this year's tournament due to NCAA reclassification.

Bracket

Asterisk denotes game ended in overtime.

Sources

References

Tournament
ASUN men's basketball tournament
Atlantic Sun men's basketball tournament
Atlantic Sun men's basketball tournament